The Overwatch World Cup (OWWC) is an annual international Overwatch esports tournament organized by Blizzard Entertainment, the game's developer, with the first edition taking place in 2016. The tournament ran every year until 2019; after a three-year hiatus, the OWWC will return in 2023.

The tournament format has varied in each year, with the most recent one involving a preliminary stage in which national teams competed against others in a single-elimination tournament system to claim the five qualification spots in the group stages, which also included five national teams who prequalified via ranking. Top-ranked teams from the group stage advanced to a single-elimination playoff bracket at Blizzard's BlizzCon event every November. The first three World Cups were won by South Korea, while the most recent one was won by the United States.

History

According to former lead game director Jeff Kaplan, Overwatch was not developed with any dedication towards esports. Dan Szymborski of ESPN stated that Overwatch was poised as the next big esport for having a sufficiently different look and playstyle from established esports titles like Counter-Strike: Global Offensive and Call of Duty, enough variety in maps and characters, and strong support from Blizzard to maintain the game for a long time. Bryant Francis writing for Gamasutra noted the speed and short match times of Overwatch make the game highly favorable for viewership, further supporting the title as an eSports title. Overwatchs progression into eSports was described by Rolling Stone as a "strategy [that] involved carefully rolling out the game in steps – first a closed beta, then open beta, then full release, then a competitive mode and finally a league."

In June 2016, the esports organizer ESL announced that they would host the first international Overwatch competition in August 2016, called Overwatch Atlantic Showdown. The competition used four open qualifiers beginning in June, followed by regional qualifiers and then a final online qualifier. Eight teams then competed for a six-figure prize in the finals to be held at Gamescom 2016 from August 20–21. Turner Broadcasting's ELeague announced the first Overwatch Open tournament, starting in July 2016, with a total prize pool of $300,000, with plans to broadcast the finals on Turner's cable channel TBS in September 2016.
In August 2016, Blizzard announced their own Overwatch international tournament, allowing users to vote for teams to represent their nation or region. Over 3 million votes to decide national teams were cast. The inaugural Overwatch World Cup was watched by 100,000 people at BlizzCon 2016. The South Korean team won the tournament, defeating the Russian team  in the final round.

In March 2017, Blizzard announced Overwatch World Cup 2017. The selection of national teams for the 2017 World Cup was different from 2016 in that participating nations were required to vote for an Overwatch World Cup National Committee. The National Committees were based upon nominations chosen by Blizzard; according to Blizzard, "analysts, coaches, statisticians, and other authorities" recommended rosters for all stages of the competition. Blizzard announced the 2017 World Cup participants in April. The 2017 World Cup experienced an issue with several players on the Chinese team being denied visas to enter the United States for the final round, causing four players on the team to be replaced by substitutes.

Format

Prior tournaments 
The 2016 format had four qualifying tournaments to thin the field for the final tournament, while the 2017 and 2018 formats used an average skill rating of each country's top players to determine which countries qualified for the tournament. Qualified teams were divided into round-robin style groups – 4 groups in 2016, 8 in 2017, and 4 in 2018. In every year, teams that made it past the group stages moved on a single-elimination playoff bracket.

The 2019 World Cup took place across three stages: preliminary rounds, group stages, and playoffs. A country's national ranking was determined by a point-ranking system based on final placements in the previous World Cups. Any country wishing to participate was eligible to play in the preliminary rounds, a single-elimination, seeded bracket. The top five countries based on their national ranking were not required to play in the preliminary rounds and received a bye to the group stages. The seeding was based on the national rankings, and the top five countries from the Preliminary Rounds advanced to the group stages. The Group Stages took place on November 1, 2019. The ten countries competing in the group stages were split evenly into two round-robin style groups. The top three countries from each group advanced to the knockout stage on November 2, with the top-ranked country from each group receiving a bye to the semifinals. The four other countries that advanced from the group stage would play in the quarterfinals. The winners of the finals would be awarded a gold medal, while the losers would be awarded silver. The two teams that lost in their respective semifinals match would play each other for the bronze medal.

Broadcasting
The World Cup was broadcast through live stream channels via the Twitch platform. Official live stream broadcast channels were provided in English, Chinese, Korean, French, Russian, German, Japanese, and Thai. Other languages were broadcast through community–run channels on the official Overwatch World Cup team page. Prior to the third edition of the event, Disney and Blizzard Entertainment announced a multiyear deal for coverage of Overwatch esports.

Results

All-time table for knockout round 

Source: OWWC

Awards
An MVP award for the Final Round of the OWC had been awarded since the inaugural tournament in 2016.

See also
Development of Overwatch
Overwatch League

References

External links

 
Annual sporting events
November sporting events
Recurring sporting events established in 2016
Sports competitions in Anaheim, California